Laconia is an unincorporated community in Fayette County, Tennessee, United States. Its ZIP code is 38045.

Notes

Unincorporated communities in Fayette County, Tennessee
Unincorporated communities in Tennessee